Viktor Alekseyevich Logunov (21 July 1944 – 10 October 2022) was a Russian track cyclist. He competed at the 1964 Olympics in the tandem and 2000 m sprint won a silver medal in the tandem with Imants Bodnieks. In retirement he coached track cycling and prepared the Unified Soviet team to the 1992 Olympics.

References

1944 births
2022 deaths
Russian male cyclists
Olympic silver medalists for the Soviet Union
Cyclists at the 1964 Summer Olympics
Olympic cyclists of the Soviet Union
Russian track cyclists
Olympic medalists in cycling
Cyclists from Moscow
Medalists at the 1964 Summer Olympics